The 2018 Svijany Open was a professional tennis tournament played on clay courts. It was the 6th edition of the tournament which was part of the 2018 ATP Challenger Tour. It took place in Liberec, Czech Republic between 30 July and 5 August 2018.

Singles main-draw entrants

Seeds

 1 Rankings are as of 23 July 2018.

Other entrants
The following players received wildcards into the singles main draw:
  Dominik Kellovský
  Patrik Rikl
  Jan Šátral
  Michael Vrbenský

The following player received entry into the singles main draw as a special exempt:
  Juan Pablo Varillas

The following player received entry into the singles main draw using a protected ranking:
  Riccardo Bellotti

The following players received entry from the qualifying draw:
  Pavel Kotov
  Zsombor Piros
  David Poljak
  Nik Razboršek

Champions

Singles

  Andrej Martin def.  Pedro Sousa 6–1, 6–2.

Doubles

  Sander Gillé /  Joran Vliegen def.  Filip Polášek /  Patrik Rikl 6–3, 6–4.

References

2018 ATP Challenger Tour
2018
2018 in Czech sport
Sport in Liberec
July 2018 sports events in Europe
August 2018 sports events in Europe